John Brown Penington (December 20, 1825 – June 1, 1902) was an American lawyer and politician, from Dover, in Kent County, Delaware. He was a member of the Democratic Party, who served as Attorney General of Delaware and two terms as U. S. Representative from Delaware.

Early life and family
Penington was born near New Castle, Delaware and pursued academic courses in New Castle and Newark, Delaware. He graduated from Jefferson College at Canonsburg, Pennsylvania. He engaged in teaching in Indiana for several years, but then returned to Delaware. There he studied law, was admitted to the Delaware Bar in 1857 and commenced the practice in Dover, Delaware.

Professional and political career
He was first a member of the Delaware House of Representatives in 1857 and then was clerk of the same Delaware House of Representatives in 1859, 1863, and 1871. He was a delegate to the renowned Democratic National Conventions at Charleston and Baltimore in the 1860 election. In 1868, he was appointed United States Attorney for the district of Delaware by President Andrew Johnson and served until 1872. He was appointed Delaware Attorney General by Governor Ponder in 1874 and served until 1879. Penington was elected as a Democrat to the 50th and 51st Congress, serving from March 4, 1887, to March 3, 1891. He was not a candidate for renomination in 1890 and resumed the practice of law at Dover.

Death and legacy
Penington died at Dover and is buried there in the Old Presbyterian Cemetery, on the grounds of the Delaware State Museum.

Penington's last years were darkened by the murders of his daughters Elizabeth and Ida, by poisoned candy. It was sent to their home from San Francisco, California by Cordelia Botkin (an ex-lover of Elizabeth's husband, John Preston Dunning). The poison was traced back to her, and Penington lived long enough to know the crime would be brought home against the perpetrator.

Almanac
Elections are held the first Tuesday after November 1. U.S. Representatives took office March 4 and have a two-year term.

References

External links
Biographical Directory of the United States Congress
Delaware's Members of Congress
Find a Grave
The Political Graveyard
A Cross Country Murder

Places with more information
Delaware Historical Society; website; 505 North Market Street, Wilmington, Delaware 19801; (302) 655-7161
University of Delaware; Library website; 181 South College Avenue, Newark, Delaware 19717; (302) 831-2965

1825 births
1902 deaths
People from New Castle, Delaware
Washington & Jefferson College alumni
Delaware lawyers
Delaware Attorneys General
United States Attorneys for the District of Delaware
Burials in Dover, Delaware
Democratic Party members of the United States House of Representatives from Delaware
19th-century American politicians